An LED-backlit LCD is a liquid-crystal display that uses LEDs for backlighting instead of traditional cold cathode fluorescent (CCFL) backlighting. LED-backlit displays use the same TFT LCD (thin-film-transistor liquid-crystal display) technologies as CCFL-backlit LCDs, but offer a variety of advantages over them.

While not an LED display, a television using such a combination of an LED backlight with an LCD panel is advertised as an LED TV by some manufacturers and suppliers.

Comparison with CCFL-backlit LCDs

Advantages
When compared with earlier CCFL backlights, using LEDs for backlighting offers:

 Wider color gamut (with RGB-LED or QDEF) and dimming range
 Greater contrast ratio
 Very slim (some screens are less than  thin in edge-lit panels)
 Significantly lighter and cooler, as much as half the total chassis and system weight of a comparable CCFL 
 Typically 20–30% lower power consumption and longer lifespan
 Greater reliability

Disadvantages
Unlike OLED and microLED displays, LCDs cannot achieve true blacks for pixels which are illuminated by the backlight. Some LED-backlit LCDs use local dimming zones to increase contrast between bright and dim areas of the display, but this can result in a "blooming" or "halo" effect on dark pixels in or adjacent to an illuminated zone. This can be considered a disadvantage compared to CCFL-backlit LCDs; however, if the display allows for the local dimming algorithm to be disabled via software, doing so will remove any blooming at the cost of negating some of the display's contrast-enhancing capabilities.

LED arrangements

LED backlights replace CCFL (fluorescent) lamps with a few to several hundred white, RGB or blue LEDs. LEDs may be edge- or direct-lit:

edge-lit (ELED): LEDs form a line around the rim of the screen
direct-lit (DLED): LEDs form an array directly behind the screen at equally spaced intervals. May additionally support:
local dimming: direct-lit LED clusters (rectangles, rows or columns) are individually controlled
full array local dimming (FALD): direct-lit LEDs are individually controlled

Additionally a special diffusion panel (light guide plate, LGP) is often used to spread the light evenly behind the screen.

The local dimming method of backlighting allows to dynamically control the level of light intensity of specific areas of darkness on the screen, resulting in much higher dynamic-contrast ratios, though at the cost of less detail in small, bright objects on a dark background, such as star fields or shadow details.

A 2016 study by the University of California (Berkeley) suggests that the subjectively perceived visual enhancement with common contrast source material levels off at about 60 LCD local dimming zones.

Technology
LED-backlit LCDs are not self-illuminating (unlike pure-LED systems). There are several methods of backlighting an LCD panel using LEDs, including the use of either white or RGB (Red, Green, and Blue) LED arrays behind the panel and edge-LED lighting (which uses white LEDs around the inside frame of the TV and a light-diffusion panel to spread the light evenly behind the LCD panel). Variations in LED backlighting offer different benefits. The first commercial full-array LED-backlit LCD TV was the Sony Qualia 005 (introduced in 2004), which used RGB LED arrays to produce a color gamut about twice that of a conventional CCFL LCD television. This was possible because red, green and blue LEDs have sharp spectral peaks which (combined with the LCD panel filters) result in significantly less bleed-through to adjacent color channels. Unwanted bleed-through channels do not "whiten" the desired color as much, resulting in a larger gamut. RGB LED technology continues to be used on Sony BRAVIA LCD models. LED backlighting using white LEDs produces a broader spectrum source feeding the individual LCD panel filters (similar to CCFL sources), resulting in a more limited display gamut than RGB LEDs at lower cost.

Television sets described as "LED TVs" are LCD-based, with the LEDs dynamically controlled using the video information (dynamic backlight control or dynamic "local dimming" LED backlight, also marketed as HDR, high dynamic range television, invented by Philips researchers Douglas Stanton, Martinus Stroomer and Adrianus de Vaan

The evolution of energy standards and the increasing public expectations regarding power consumption made it necessary for backlight systems to manage their power. As for other consumer electronics products (e.g., fridges or light bulbs), energy consumption categories are enforced for television sets. Standards for power ratings for TV sets have been introduced, e.g., in the US, EU, Australia, and China. A 2008 study showed that among European countries power consumption is one of the most important criteria for consumers when they choose a television, as important as the screen size.

Using PWM (pulse-width modulation), a technology where the intensity of the LEDs are kept constant but the brightness adjustment is achieved by varying a time interval of flashing these constant light intensity light sources, the backlight is dimmed to the brightest color that appears on the screen while simultaneously boosting the LCD contrast to the maximum achievable levels, drastically increasing the perceived contrast ratio, increasing the dynamic range, improving the viewing angle dependency of the LCD and drastically reducing power consumption.

The combination of LED dynamic backlight control in combination with reflective polarizers and prismatic films (invented by Philips researchers Adrianus de Vaan and Paulus Schaareman make these "LED" (LCD) televisions far more efficient than the previous CRT-based sets, leading to a worldwide energy saving of 600 TWh in 2017, equal to 10% of the electricity consumption of all households worldwide, or twice the energy production of all solar cells in the world.

The prismatic and reflective polarization films are generally achieved using so called DBEF films manufactured and supplied by 3M. These reflective polarization films using uniaxial oriented polymerized liquid crystals (birefringent polymers or birefringent glue) were invented in 1989 by Philips researchers Dirk Broer, Adrianus de Vaan and Joerg Brambring.

A first dynamic "local dimming" LED backlight was public demonstrated by BrightSide Technologies in 2003, and later commercially introduced for professional markets (such as video post-production). Edge LED lighting was first introduced by Sony in September 2008 on the  BRAVIA KLV-40ZX1M (known as the ZX1 in Europe). Edge-LED lighting for LCDs allows thinner housing; the Sony BRAVIA KLV-40ZX1M is 1 cm thick, and others are also extremely thin.

LED-backlit LCDs have longer life and better energy efficiency than plasma and CCFL LCD TVs. Unlike CCFL backlights, LEDs use no mercury, an environmental pollutant, in their manufacture. However, other elements (such as gallium and arsenic) are used in the manufacture of the LED emitters; there is debate over whether they are a better long-term solution to the problem of screen disposal.

Because LEDs can be switched on and off more quickly than CCFLs and can offer a higher light output, it is theoretically possible to offer very high contrast ratios. They can produce deep blacks (LEDs off) and high brightness (LEDs on). However, measurements made from pure-black and pure-white outputs are complicated by edge-LED lighting not allowing these outputs to be reproduced simultaneously on screen.

Full-array mini-LED backlights, consisting of several thousand WLEDs, were being researched for TVs and mobile devices in 2017.

The white LEDs in LED backlights may use special silicate phosphors, which are brighter but degrade faster. The size of the LEDs is one of the factors that determines the size of the bezel of LED-backlit LCDs.

Quantum dot enhancement film (QDEF)

Quantum dots are photoluminescent; they are useful in displays because they emit light in specific, narrow normal distributions of wavelengths. To generate white light best suited as an LCD backlight, parts of the light of a blue-emitting LED are transformed by quantum dots into small-bandwidth green and red light such that the combined white light allows a nearly ideal color gamut to be generated by the RGB color filters of the LCD panel. The quantum dors may be in a separate layer as a quantum dot enhacement film, or replace pigment-based green and red resists normally used in LCD color filters. In addition, efficiency is improved, as intermediate colors are no longer present and do not have to be filtered out by the color filters of the LCD screen. This can result in a display that more accurately renders colors in the visible spectrum. Companies  developing quantum dot solutions for displays include Nanosys, 3M as a licensee of Nanosys, QD Vision of Lexington, Massachusetts, US and Avantama of Switzerland. This type of backlighting was demonstrated by various TV manufacturers at the Consumer Electronics Show 2015. Samsung introduced their first 'QLED' quantum dot displays at CES 2017 and later formed the 'QLED Alliance' with Hisense and TCL to market the technology.

Mini LED 

Mini LED displays are LED-backlit LCDs with mini-LED–based backlighting supporting over a thousand full array local dimming (FALD) zones, providing deeper blacks and a higher contrast ratio.

Backlight-dimming flicker 
LED backlights are often dimmed by applying pulse-width modulation to the supply current, switching the backlight off and on more quickly than the eye can perceive. If the dimming-pulse frequency is too low or the user is sensitive to flicker, this may cause discomfort and eyestrain similar to the flicker of CRT displays at lower refresh rates. This can be tested by simply waving a hand in front of the screen; if it appears to have sharply-defined edges as it moves, the backlight is pulsing at a fairly low frequency. If the hand appears blurry, the display either has a continuously-illuminated backlight or is operating at a frequency too high to perceive. Flicker can be reduced (or eliminated) by setting the display to full brightness, although this can degrade image quality and increases power consumption.

See also
 Uniformity tape

References

External links 
 

Display technology
Japanese inventions
Light-emitting diodes
Television technology